The 2012 Holland Heineken House was the Dutch meeting place for supporters, athletes and other followers during the 2012 Summer Olympics in London, organized by Heineken and NOC*NSF. It was the 11th edition of the Holland Heineken House since 1982. The 2012 House opened its doors on the day of the opening ceremony on 27 July 2012 and closed on the day of the closing ceremony, 12 August 2012. Due to the expected numbers of visitors, tickets were sold in advance. With about six thousand visitors per day, over hundred thousand visitors the venue during the Games.

The layout

The 2012 Holland Heineken House had various shops, restaurants, reception rooms for sponsors and athletes, media facilities and a NOC*NSF information desk. During the day visitors could watch Olympic events on big screens and play different sports. There was a big hall for medal celebrations and performances of different artists during the night. The overall design and executions was created by Gielissen Interiors & Exhibitions.

Medal celebrations

Dutch medalist together with their coaches were honoured on the day they won on medal or later when they had to participate in other events. Because Marianne Vos won her gold medal in the road cycling women's road race due to the team performance of the Dutch team, her teammates Ellen van Dijk, Annemiek van Vleuten, Loes Gunnewijk  were honoured as well.

References

External links

 Official website
 Virtual tour

Venues of the 2012 Summer Olympics
Netherlands at the Olympics
Heineken
H